William Clement may refer to:
 Bill Clement (rugby union) (1915–2007), rugby union player from Wales
 Bill Clement (born 1950), ice hockey player from Canada
 William Clement (academic) (1707–1782), Irish academic
 William James Clement (1802–1870), English surgeon and Liberal Party politician
 William Innell Clement (1780–1852), English newspaper proprietor
 William Pope Clement (1887–1982), lawyer and politician in Ontario, Canada
 William T. Clement (1897–1955), general of the United States Marine Corps during World War II
 Willy Clément (1918–1965), French baritone
 William Clement (cricketer) (1820–1864), English cricketer
 William Clement (priest) (died 1711), English priest

See also

William Clements (disambiguation)